Phenylpiperidines are chemical compounds with a phenyl moiety directly attached to piperidine. There are a variety of pharmacological effects associated with phenylpiperidines including morphine-like activity or other central nervous system effects.

Methylphenidate is a benzylpiperidine.

References

Piperidines